The Federal Chancellor is the head of the Federal Chancellery of Switzerland, the oldest Swiss federal institution, established at the initiative of Napoleon in 1803. The officeholder acts as the general staff of the seven-member Federal Council. The Chancellor is not a member of the government and the office is not at all comparable to that of the Chancellor of Germany or the Chancellor of Austria.

The current Chancellor, Walter Thurnherr, a member of The Centre from Aargau, was elected on 9 December 2015. He began his term on 1 January 2016. Thurnherr was reelected on 11 December 2019.

Election
The Federal Chancellor is elected for a four-year term by both chambers of the Federal Assembly, assembled together, at the same time (and by the same process) as it elects the Federal Council. The election is conducted by secret ballot using an exhaustive ballot in which each member of the Assembly can vote for any eligible person in the first two rounds, but only remaining candidates in subsequent rounds. If no candidate receives an absolute majority, the candidate(s) with the fewest votes is eliminated.

Vice-Chancellors

One or two Vice-Chancellors are also appointed. In contrast to the Chancellor, they are appointed directly by the Federal Council. Prior to 1852, the position was called the State Secretary of the Confederation. The two current Vice-Chancellors are André Simonazzi from Valais (Independent) since 2009 (also spokesman of the Federal Council) and Viktor Rossi from Bern (GLP/PVL) since 2019.

Role
The position is a political appointment and has only a technocratic role.

The Chancellor attends meetings of the Federal Council but does not have a vote. The Chancellor also prepares the Federal Council's reports to the Federal Assembly on its policy and activities. Still, the Chancellor's position is often referred to as that of an "eighth Federal Councillor". The chancellery is also responsible for the publication of all federal laws.

List of Federal Chancellors

See also
Politics of Switzerland
List of presidents of the Swiss Confederation
List of members of the Swiss Federal Council
Lists of office-holders

Sources 
 
 Hans-Urs Willi. "The Chancellor: a few historical highlights on the development of their person and the office from ancient times to the Middle Ages and the Zenden Republic of Valais". In Klaus, Michel (editor): Quelle chance pour nos institutions? Mélanges offerts à Monsieur François Couchepin, chancelier de la Confédération à l'occasion de son 60e anniversaire / Festschrift für Bundeskanzler François Couchepin zum 60. Geburtstag. Schlieren 1995. Translated by Paul Suffrin and Elsbeth Hagan.

References

Notes

External links
 Official website
 A Walk through the History of the Federal Chancellery, in German, French and Italian, on the web site of the Federal Chancellery
 

 01
.
Federal Chancellors
Federal Chancellors